Events from the year 1497 in Ireland.

Incumbent
Lord: Henry VII

Events
 July – Perkin Warbeck, Pretender to the English throne, lands in the south of Ireland but attracts little support.
 Start of great famine.

Births

Deaths
James Ormonde, Lord Treasurer of Ireland, Earl of Ormonde (b. c. 1418)

References

 
1490s in Ireland
Ireland
Years of the 15th century in Ireland